Christopher T. Walsh (February 16, 1944 – January 10, 2023) was a Hamilton Kuhn professor of biological chemistry and pharmacology at Harvard Medical School. His research focused on enzymes and enzyme inhibition, and most recently focused on the problem of antibiotic resistance. He was elected to the National Academy of Sciences in 1989.

Early life and education
Walsh earned his A.B. degree in biology from Harvard University in 1965. As an undergraduate, he worked with E. O. Wilson and published a first author paper in the journal Nature, where he and his colleagues described the composition of the fire ant trail substance. He went on to graduate school at Rockefeller University, where he earned his Ph.D. in life science in 1970.

Career
Walsh completed a postdoctoral fellowship with Robert Abeles at Brandeis University in 1972, and later that year joined the faculty at Massachusetts Institute of Technology as a professor of chemistry and biology. In 1987, he joined the faculty at Harvard Medical School, where he remained. Walsh authored more than 650 publications in scholarly journals and trained several graduate students and postdoctoral researchers. Among his professional activities, Walsh was a member of the Board of Scientific Governors of The Scripps Research Institute, the American Philosophical Society, The National Academy of Sciences, Institute of Medicine, American Academy of Arts and Sciences, and the American Academy of Microbiology.

Death
Walsh died following a fall on January 10, 2023, at the age of 78.

Notable publications

Books
Enzymatic Reaction Mechanisms (1978). Published by Freeman Inc.
Antibiotics: Actions, Origins, Resistance (2003), by Christopher Walsh. Published by ASM Press.
Post-translation Modification of Proteins: Expanding Nature's Inventory (2006), by C.T. Walsh. Published by Roberts and Company.

References

External links
 Walsh et al publications on Pubmed

1944 births
2023 deaths
Members of the United States National Academy of Sciences
American biochemists
Harvard College alumni
Rockefeller University alumni
Harvard Medical School faculty
Massachusetts Institute of Technology faculty
Fellows of the American Academy of Microbiology
Members of the American Philosophical Society
Members of the National Academy of Medicine
Scientists from Boston